Brandon Watts (born January 21, 1991) is a former American football linebacker. He played college football at Georgia Tech. He was drafted by the Minnesota Vikings in the seventh round, 223rd overall, of the 2014 NFL Draft.

Early years
Watts attended Washington County High School in Sandersville, Georgia, where he earned four varsity letters in football, playing quarterback and safety, and served two years as a team captain. As a senior in 2008, he recorded 86 tackles (nine for loss) and three interceptions on defense, as well as three rushing touchdowns as a quarterback, despite only playing in eight games because of a torn labrum in the shoulder. He was an honorable mention All-State (GHSA), was named to the Augusta Chronicle All-Georgia Team, was named Region 3AAA Defensive Player of the Year and was a first-team All-Middle Georgia. He also ran track & field all four years as a sprinter and played basketball for two seasons.

Regarded as a three-star recruit by Rivals.com, Watts was listed as the 68th best player in the state of Georgia. He committed to Georgia Tech on March 19, 2008. He also had scholarship offers from Auburn and Georgia

College career
Watts attended Georgia Institute of Technology, where he played for the Georgia Tech Yellow Jackets football team from 2009 to 2013. He was productive in his two years as a starter, collecting 143 total tackles in 26 games.

In 2012, Watts played a majority of the snaps on defense and recorded 77 tackles.

Watts finished his senior season after coming back from an injury with 66 total tackles (42 solo), and 3.5 tackles for loss. He added an interception, a pass break-up, a forced fumble and 2.5 sacks.

Professional career

Pre-draft

At his Pro Day, Watts stood out with a 4.41 40-yard dash, 37.5 inch (0.95m) vertical jump, and 10'3" (3.14m) broad jump, which would have all been near the top at this position at the combine. He also posted a 6.89-second three-cone drill.

Minnesota Vikings
Watts was selected with the 223rd pick in the 2014 NFL Draft by the Minnesota Vikings.  He signed a 4-year, $2,282,448 contract, including a $62,448 signing bonus guaranteed, and an average annual salary of $570,612. On September 3, 2016, he was released by the Vikings as part of final roster cuts.

Miami Dolphins
Watts was signed to the Dolphins practice squad on September 6, 2016. He signed a reserve/future contract with the Dolphins on January 10, 2017. He was waived on September 2, 2017.

Atlanta Legends
On August 17, 2018, Watts signed with Atlanta Legends of the Alliance of American Football for the 2019 season. The league ceased operations in April 2019.

References

External links
Georgia Tech Yellow Jackets bio

1991 births
Living people
Georgia Tech Yellow Jackets football players
Players of American football from Georgia (U.S. state)
People from Sandersville, Georgia
People from Tennille, Georgia
American football linebackers
Minnesota Vikings players
Miami Dolphins players
Atlanta Legends players